Johann II may refer to:
 Johann II, Prince of Liechtenstein
 Johann II, Duke of Opava-Ratibor
 Johann II, Lord of Mecklenburg
 Johann II (Habsburg-Laufenburg)

See also
John II (disambiguation)